House of Tomorrow or The House of Tomorrow can mean:
 The House of Tomorrow (1949 film), 1949 cartoon directed by Tex Avery
 The House of Tomorrow (album), 1992 album by The Magnetic Fields
 "House of Tomorrow" (Back to You), episode of the TV series Back to You, first aired July 9, 2008
 The House of Tomorrow (2010 novel), written by Peter Bognanni
 The House of Tomorrow (documentary), a 2011 documentary film by Shamim Sarif
 The House of Tomorrow (2017 film), 2017 American drama film based on the 2010 novel
 House of Tomorrow (Indiana), house in Beverly Shores, Indiana, United States
 House of Tomorrow (Baltimore), house in the Guilford neighborhood of Baltimore, Maryland, United States

See also  
 1933 Homes of Tomorrow Exhibition in Chicago, Illinois